alpha-Hydroxyetizolam is the pharmacologically active metabolite of etizolam. alpha-Hydroxyetizolam has a half-life of approximately 8.2 hours.

Etizolam's other non-pharmacologically active metabolite in humans is 8-hydroxyetizolam.

See also 

 Etizolam
 Alprazolam
 Brotizolam
 Clotiazepam
 Deschloroetizolam
 Metizolam
 Benzodiazepine dependence
 Benzodiazepine withdrawal syndrome
 Long-term effects of benzodiazepines

References

External links 
 Inchem.org - Etizolam

Chloroarenes
Designer drugs
GABAA receptor positive allosteric modulators
Hypnotics
Thienotriazolodiazepines
Human drug metabolites